Ivy Duffy Doherty (June 22, 1922 – August 24, 2008) was an Australian-American writer best known for her young adult fiction.

Partial list of works
Susan Haskell, Missionary (1958)  ASIN B0007EIZ4W
The Extra Mile (book) (1962)  ASIN B0012S7P02
My Need for a Magic Carpet (1962)  ASIN B000OV6S74
Singing Tree and Laughing Water (1970)  ASIN B0006C2P71
Prisoner in the Beech Tree (1972)  ASIN B0006C4DSM
Here I Am, Em B! (1981)  
For Rent One Grammy One Gramps (1982)  
Rainbows of Promise (1983)

Notes and references

1922 births
2008 deaths
Australian children's writers
People from the Hunter Region
People from Talent, Oregon
Australian emigrants to the United States